
Skid or Skids may refer to:

 Skid, a type of pallet
 Skid (aerodynamics), an outward side-slip in an aircraft turn
 Skid (automobile), an automobile handling condition where one or more tires are slipping relative to the road
 Skid, a sled runner
 Skids, vehicles with continuous track
 Skids, or skid loaders, a vehicle
 Skids, a nautical term for slipway
 Modular process skid, an engineered frame for equipment
 Skid, alias for script kiddie

Comics, games and amusements
 Skids (comics), characters in Marvel-published comics
 Skids (Transformers), several fictional robot superhero characters in the Transformers robot superhero franchise.
 Skid, a type of amusement ride

Music
 Skid (album), 1970, by Skid Row
 Skids (band), a Scottish band
 Skids (EP) a 1977 EP by the Scottish band

See also
 Skidder, a vehicle used in a logging operation for pulling cut trees out of a forest in a process called "skidding"